Orthoprosopa is a genus of hoverflies from the family Syrphidae, in the order Diptera.

Species
Subgenus: Orthoprosopa Macquart, 1850
Orthoprosopa grisea (Walker, 1835)
Orthoprosopa xylotaeformis (Schiner, 1868)
Subgenus: Paratropidia  Hull, 1949
Orthoprosopa alex (Thompson, 1972)
Orthoprosopa bilineata (Walker, 1849)
Orthoprosopa margarita (Thompson, 1972)
Orthoprosopa multicolor (Ferguson, 1926)
Orthoprosopa pacifica (Hippa, 1980)

References

Diptera of Australasia
Eristalinae
Hoverfly genera
Taxa named by Pierre-Justin-Marie Macquart